The 1888 Scottish Cup final played at the second Hampden Park in Crosshill (today part of Glasgow) on 4 February 1888 was won by Renton, who beat Cambuslang 6–1.

Renton were favourites going into the match, the Dunbartonshire club having already lifted the trophy in 1885 and finished runners-up to Queen's Park in 1886; in contrast, it was Cambuslang's first and only major final, though the Lanarkshire side had won the first edition of the Glasgow Cup a week earlier, beating Rangers. Reports from the day indicate that despite the outcome the final was very evenly fought for the most part, with Cambuslang having several chances and Renton goalkeeper John Lindsay performing strongly before his team eventually took control of the play. The margin of victory stood as a Scottish Cup Final record outright until being matched in 1972, but has never been surpassed.

Three months later the same teams contested the final of the Glasgow Merchants Charity Cup at the same venue, Renton again winning by a 4–0 scoreline for what was their third of four successive victories in that competition. A week after that, they became unofficial "World Champions" after challenging and defeating FA Cup holders West Bromwich Albion.

Summary

Teams

See also
1887–88 Scottish Cup

References

Scotland - Cup Results 1873/74-1877/78 and 1889/90-1995/96, RSSSF

Scottish Cup Finals
Scottish Cup Final 1888
Scottish Cup Final 1888
February 1888 events
1888 in Scottish sport
1880s in Glasgow